WPGG (1450 AM; "WPG Talk Radio 95.5") is a commercial radio station licensed to Atlantic City, New Jersey. The station is owned by Townsquare Media and it broadcasts a talk radio format.  The radio studios and offices are on Tilton Road in Northfield, New Jersey.

WPGG is powered at 1,000 watts, using a non-directional antenna.  It can be heard throughout New Jersey's Ocean, Atlantic, and Cape May Counties and parts of Delaware.  The transmitter is on Riverside Street, near Absecon Boulevard (U.S. Route 30) in Atlantic City.  WPGG is simulcast on FM translator W238CZ at 95.5 MHz.  WPGG programming can also be heard using an HD Radio on 97.3 WENJ-HD3.

Programming
Weekdays start with a local news and information show, "Hurley in the Morning," hosted by Harry Hurley.  The rest of the schedule is from nationally syndicated conservative talk shows:  Brian Kilmeade, "Markley, Van Camp and Robbins," Sean Hannity, Mark Levin, Jimmy Failla, Joe Pags, "Red Eye Radio" and "First Light."  

Weekends feature shows on money, health, the outdoors, food, travel and home repair.  Weekend hosts include Dana Loesch, Doug Stephan, Dave Ramsey and Kevin McCullough.  Most hours begin with an update from Fox News Radio.

History
Atlantic City’s first radio station, WPG ("World's Play Ground"), began broadcasting at 1100 kHz in 1923, reaching listeners in South Jersey, Delaware, and Maryland. Its studios were located inside of the Atlantic City Convention Hall, now known as Boardwalk Hall. The radio station was operated by the Columbia Broadcasting System (CBS) and utilized a 5,000-watt transmitter to air its radio signals along the Eastern Seaboard. WPG ended its broadcasts from Boardwalk Hall in 1939. Two other stations, WBAB and WFPG – which delivered news and entertainment from its studio on Steel Pier – succeeded WPG and began airing in the 1940s.

The 1450 frequency in Atlantic City first hit the airwaves in 1940 with its call letters of WFPG, which stood for "World's Famous Play Ground." For several decades, WFPG aired a full service format, which included a mixture of adult standards, big band, and easy listening music, from studios on the world-famous Steel Pier on the Atlantic City boardwalk.

Towards the late 1970s, when casino gambling arrived in Atlantic City, WFPG became "Win 1450" and changed its call letters to WIIN, continuing its full-service format, albeit with an adult contemporary flavor. Later, the station used the taped, syndicated "Entertainers" MOR format, using live announcers in some dayparts.

In 1985, Roger Tees took over as news director and hired anchors, Jeff Scott, Greg Gaston, Carla Contento Kenny, and Vince Scanlon, along with sports director Jim Wise and sports anchor Greg Toland. When the all-news/talk anchors departed for other positions in larger markets, ratings plummeted. On January 18, 1988, the WFPG call letters, which had remained in use on a co-owned FM station, returned to the AM facility.

For much of the 1990s, syndicated talk programs such as Bob Grant, Mike Gallagher, and Art Bell were mainstays of the station's line-up.

In 1999, WFPG became one of the first affiliates of the Comedy World Radio Network. A year later, Comedy World went out of business and the station resorted to simulcasting WFPG-FM during most hours. Their logo said 1450 WFPG AM.

Shortly after entering the new century, WFPG and its sister stations were purchased by Millennium Radio Group, which also owned New Jersey 101.5 in Trenton. In March 2002, New Jersey 101.5 began using 1450 as its South Jersey shore simulcast facility, with a call letter change from WFPG to WKXW.

In 2003, the New Jersey 101.5 simulcast moved to WXKW at 97.3 and ESPN Radio sports programming took its place. In June 2006, 1450 AM changed its call letters to WENJ to reflect its ESPN Radio branding.

In June 2009, the ESPN format was moved to 97.3 WENJ-FM and WENJ began to carry ESPN Deportes Radio. This lasted until January 2011, when ESPN Deportes was dropped for a simulcast of WENJ-FM.

On October 22, 2012, WENJ dropped the sports simulcast for talk, branded as "WPG Talk Radio 1450" with new call sign WPGG, paying tribute to the original WPG, a radio station owned by the city of Atlantic City from 1925 to 1938.

In November 2015, WPGG began simulcasting its programming on WSJO 104.9-HD2. In April 2016, W281BH, a translator at 104.1 FM, began simulcasting WSJO 104.9-HD2, which brings WPGG's programming to 104.1 in the greater Atlantic City area. In May 2016, WPGG renamed itself to "WPG Talk Radio 104.1."

On August 2, 2017, Townsquare Media filed an application with the Federal Communications Commission requesting consent to construct and broadcast WPGG from a new translator station broadcasting on 95.5 FM and licensed to Atlantic City, New Jersey. On May 9, 2019, the station announced it was moving from 104.1 FM to 95.5 FM, effective immediately.

In July 2020, WPGG became the Atlantic City-Cape May radio market's top-rated news/talk station in both share and cume, per Nielsen's spring 2020 radio ratings survey results.

References

External links
FCC History Cards for WPGG

 
 

Talk radio stations in the United States
PGG
Radio stations established in 1940
Townsquare Media radio stations
1940 establishments in New Jersey